Price of Fame and The Price of Fame may refer to:

Music
"Price of Fame" (song), a song by Michael Jackson
"Price of Fame", a song by Submersed from Immortal Verses
"Price of Fame", a song by Paloma Faith from The Architect (album)
The Price of Fame, 2006 album by Bow Wow

Film & TV
The Price of Fame (1916 film), American silent film by Charles Brabin 
The Price of Fame (2014 film), French film by Xavier Beauvois 
"The Price of Fame", a 2003 episode of Everwood, see List of Everwood episodes
The Price of Fame, a 2005 episode of The Buzz on Maggie